Notodoris citrina is a species of sea slug. It is a dorid nudibranch, a shell-less marine gastropod mollusc in the family Aegiridae.

Distribution 
This species was described from Rarotonga, Cook Islands. It lives in the Indo-west Pacific area, where it has been found in Queensland, Australia; Indonesia, the Marshall Islands, Papua New Guinea and New Caledonia.

Description
Notodoris citrina can grow to 60 mm in length. It is entirely yellow in colour. There are raised yellow tubercles all over the body and three fused extra-brachial appendages which shelter the gills. The rhinophores are also yellow in adults but black in juveniles.

Diet
Notodoris citrina feeds on calcareous sponges belonging to the family Leucettidae.

References

Aegiridae
Gastropods described in 1875